The Combined Munitions Assignments Board was a major government agency for the U.S. and Britain in World War II. With Harry Hopkins, Roosevelt's top advisor in charge, it took control of the allocation of  war supplies and Lend lease aid to the Allies, especially Britain and the Soviet Union.

Churchill's original plan called for two offices for the Board, one in London which he controlled, and one in Washington under Harry Hopkins. The US Army strongly protested, and insisted that the board be under the control of the Combined Chiefs of Staff, the body that brought together the top American and British military commanders. General George C. Marshall, US Army Chief of Staff, argued that the distribution of munitions was so essential to military strategy, that it could never be left to civilians. His argument won out. Hopkins became the head of the Board, but he always saw his role as subordinate to the Combined Chiefs.

Canada asked for a seat on the Board; it was refused but was given a seat on other, much less powerful combined boards.

President Franklin D. Roosevelt and Prime Minister Winston Churchill set it up in January 1942 with a threefold mission:
1. The entire munitions resources of Great Britain and the United States will be deemed to be in a common pool, about which the fullest information will be interchanged.
 2. Committees will be formed in Washington and London under the combined Chiefs of Staff in a manner similar to the S.W. Pacific agreement. These committees will advise on all assignments both in quality and priority, whether to Great Britain and the United States or other of the united nations, in accordance with strategic needs.
3. In order that these committees may be fully apprised of the policy of their respective Governments, the President will nominate a civil chairman, who will preside over the committee in Washington, and the Prime Minister will make a similar nomination in respect of the committee in London. In each case the committee will be assisted by a secretariat capable of surveying every branch and keeping in touch with the work of every sub-committee as may be necessary.

See also
 Combined Food Board
 Combined Raw Materials Board
 Combined Production and Resources Board
 Combined Shipping Adjustment Board
 Military production during World War II

Notes

Further reading
Allen, R.G.D. "Mutual Aid between the U.S. and the British Empire, 1941–5", in Journal of the Royal Statistical Society no. 109 #3, 1946. pp 243–77 in JSTOR  detailed statistical data on Lend Lease
Clarke, Sir Richard. Anglo-American Economic Collaboration in War and Peace, 1942-1949. (1982), British perspective
Dobson, Alan P. U.S. Wartime Aid to Britain, 1940-1946 London, 1986.
 Hall, Hessel Duncan, and Christopher Crompton Wrigley. Studies of overseas supply. Vol. 1 (London: HM Stationery Office, 1956), the official British history
Herring Jr. George C. Aid to Russia, 1941-1946: Strategy, Diplomacy, the Origins of the Cold War (1973) online edition
Kimball, Warren F. The Most Unsordid Act: Lend-Lease, 1939-1941 (1969).
 Leighton, Richard M., and  Robert W. Coakley. Global Logistics and Strategy, 1940-1943 (1955) 813 pages    online
 Llewellin, Colonel J.J. "Machinery of Wartime Cooperation between the British Commonwealth and the United States." World Affairs (Sept. 1943) 106#3 pp. 157–163 in JSTOR
Roll, David.  The Hopkins Touch: Harry Hopkins and the Forging of the Alliance to Defeat Hitler (2012)  excerpt and text search and author webcast presentation
 Sherwood, Robert E. Roosevelt and Hopkins (1948), memoir by senior FDR aide; Pulitzer Prize. online edition
 Tuttle, Dwight William. Harry L. Hopkins and Anglo-American-Soviet Relations, 1941-1945 (1983)
Woods, Randall Bennett. A Changing of the Guard: Anglo-American Relations, 1941-1946 (1990)

United Kingdom–United States relations
Military logistics of World War II